IMeasureU (IMU) is a wearable technology company. They make inertial measurement unit that analyze running movements and other body movements in elite sports. They combine the sensor data with computational models to accurately model human body movement. IMeasureU has worked extensively with Athletics Australia helping their elite runners.

In July 2017, the company was acquired by Vicon, an English company specializing in motion capture, with the plan to integrate Vicon's camera systems with IMeasureU's sensors.

On 23 June 2015, IMeasureU launched an Indiegogo campaign seeking to raise US$200,000 to develop a consumer solution that reduces the risk of running-related injuries.

See also
Running injuries
Biomechanics of sprint running

References

External links
 IMeasureU

Wearable devices
Wearable computers
Activity trackers
Manufacturing companies based in Auckland
Biomechanics
Sportswear brands
Running